Marilyn Lea Miller (October 9, 1930 – May 22, 2014) was an American librarian and educator and president of the American Library Association from 1992 to 1993.

Miller was born in St. Joseph, Missouri to James Irving Miller and Merna Liggett Miller. She received her bachelor's degree in education from the University of Kansas in 1952 and went on to receive her master's and doctorate degrees in 1959 and 1976 respectively from the University of Michigan. She was a school librarian in Kansas from 1952 to 1961 when she became the first school library consultant for the Kansas State Department of Public Instruction. In 1977, she joined the School of Library Science at the University of North Carolina at Chapel Hill as an associate professor. She became chair of the Department of Library Science and Information Studies at the University of North Carolina at Greensboro (UNCG) in 1987. She retired from that position in 1995. While at UNCG, Miller established a distance education program for the program.

Awards and honors
 Distinguished School Library Media Specialist Award, Kansas Association of School Librarians (1987)
 Distinguished Alumna Award, the School of Information and Library Studies, the University of Michigan (1988)
 Award for Professional Contributions to Library and Information Science Education, Association for Library and Information Science Education (1999)
 Distinguished Service Award, Association for Library Services to Children (2005)

References

 

1930 births
2014 deaths
American librarians
American women librarians
Presidents of the American Library Association
University of Michigan alumni
University of North Carolina at Greensboro faculty
University of North Carolina at Chapel Hill faculty
American women academics
21st-century American women